Ofoten is a traditional district in Nordland county in Northern Norway.  It consists of the municipalities of Tysfjord, Ballangen, Evenes, Tjeldsund, Narvik, and Lødingen.  It is named after the main fjord, Ofotfjorden, which is at the center of this district.  The  district was home to 29,968 residents in 2016, with almost half of the residents living in the town of Narvik.

Geography
About 43% of the area lies above . Below elevations of  there are forests. The mountains are high especially in the east. In the interior parts of the municipality, there are a number of glaciers, such as Gihtsejiegŋa, and also many lakes. Besides the Ofotfjorden, there are a number of other fjords that cut into the landscapes, often with steep shorelines.

The traditional district of Lofoten lies to the west of Ofoten, to the south is the traditional district of Salten, to the east is northern Sweden, and to the north is Troms county.

History
The municipality of Ofoten was established on 1 January 1838 (see formannskapsdistrikt).  On 1 January 1884, the municipality ceased to exist when it was split into two municipalities: Ankenes (population: 1,734) and Evindnæs (population: 2,397).

Name
The district is named after Ofotfjorden (Old Norse: Ófóti). The meaning of the first element is unknown and the last element is derived from the Old Norse word fótr which means "foot".  The oldest form of the name could have been Úffóti.  In this case, the first element is úfr which means "Eurasian eagle-owl".  The three inner branches of the Ofotfjord might have been compared with the three claws of an owl.

Media gallery

See also
Radio Narvik

References

 
Districts of Nordland